KBMC may refer to:

 KBMC (FM), a radio station (102.1 FM) licensed to serve Bozeman, Montana, United States
 KBMC-LP, a low-power radio station (104.5 FM) licensed to serve Mack's Creek, Missouri, United States
 Brigham City Airport (ICAO code KBMC)